Rapor is an EP from Active Child released on October 22, 2013. The first single from the EP, "Evening Ceremony", was featured in the 2013 film The Host. The second single, "She Cut Me", was released on August 12, 2013. The third single, "Subtle" featuring Mikky Ekko, was released on September 10, 2013.

Track listing
Adapted from iTunes Store.

Release history

References

2013 EPs